Jiří Hunkes (born July 31, 1984) is a Czech professional ice hockey defenceman currently an unrestricted free agent who most recently played for Schwenninger Wild Wings in the Deutsche Eishockey Liga (DEL). He formerly played with HC Bílí Tygři Liberec in the Czech Extraliga during the 2010–11 Czech Extraliga season.

Hunkes previously played for HC Oceláři Třinec, Lukko Rauma, Pelicans Lahti and BK Mladá Boleslav. After a season with HC Lada Togliatti of the Kontinental Hockey League (KHL), Hunkes signed his first contract in Germany, agreeing to a one-year deal with Schwenninger Wild Wings of the DEL on July 10, 2015.

In the 2016–17 season, Hunkes returned for his second year with the Wild Wings, but was unable to repeat his performance in adding just 1 goal and 3 points in 32 contests. On March 3, 2017, it was announced that Hunkes would leave the club as a free agent.

References

External links

1984 births
Czech ice hockey defencemen
HC Bílí Tygři Liberec players
HC Lada Togliatti players
HC Lev Praha players
HC Lev Poprad players
Living people
Lukko players
HC Oceláři Třinec players
BK Mladá Boleslav players
Lahti Pelicans players
Schwenninger Wild Wings players
HC Sparta Praha players
Ice hockey people from Brno
Czech expatriate ice hockey players in Finland
Czech expatriate ice hockey players in Slovakia
Czech expatriate ice hockey players in Russia
Czech expatriate ice hockey players in Germany
Czech expatriate sportspeople in France
Expatriate ice hockey players in France